Măcrișu River may refer to:

 Măcrișu, a tributary of the Pleșu in Gorj County
 Măcrișu, a tributary of the Zăbala in Vrancea County

See also 
 Măcriș River (disambiguation)